Zebrasoma scopas, the brown tang, twotone tang, scopas tang or brush-tail tang, is a marine reef tang in the fish family Acanthuridae. The brown tang is found throughout Oceania and is a herbivorous fish, feeding predominantly on filamentous algae. It is a highly popular fish in the aquarium trade.

Description
The head is whitish and the body pale brown shading to a dark brownish-black near the black tail. There are faint pale green longitudinal lines starting as dots at the head end and becoming continuous and then dotted again posteriorly. The juveniles are rather paler and have yellowish bars near the anterior end. They also have relatively larger dorsal fins. The adults have a white spine on the caudal peduncle. The large, sail-like dorsal fin has 4 or 5 spines and 23 to 25 soft rays. The anal fin has 3 spines and 19 to 21 soft rays.

Distribution
Its range extends from the coasts of East Africa to Japan, the Pitcairn Islands, Malaysia, Indonesia, Japan, Australia, Lord Howe Island and Rapa Iti. In 2008, a brown tang was observed near Fort Lauderdale, Florida, far outside its native range.

Biology
The brown tang feeds mainly on filamentous algae. For this purpose it has specialised pharyngeal teeth. It is usually found on the exposed side of reefs and in coral-rich lagoons. The adults are gregarious and sometimes form schools but the juveniles are solitary and are often to be found swimming among corals.

The brown tang is monogamous, though spawning has been observed both between pairs and among small groups. The male tends to be larger than the female. The fish rush up to the surface to spawn, fertilisation is external and the eggs are scattered in the water column. The larvae are planktonic for several weeks before settling and undergoing metamorphosis into juveniles.

Use in aquaria
Brown tangs are readily available and are easier tangs for the novice aquarist.  Brown tangs do not bother coral and are safe to keep in a reef aquarium. They are smaller and less aggressive than other members of the family Acanthuridae. Brown tangs require an aquarium no less than 75 gallons. These fish are more tolerant of a wide range of living conditions. They will accept various food including meaty materials but the main part of the diet should be vegetable. They will eat the algae that tend to grow inadvertently in the tank. Brown tangs are one of the more peaceful species within its genus and can be kept with other species of tangs.

References

External links
 

Fish of Thailand
Acanthuridae
Fish described in 1829
Taxa named by Georges Cuvier